Savaari 2 is a 2014 Indian Kannada language romantic drama film produced and directed by Jacob Verghese. It is a sequel to 2009 film Savaari.

Plot
The movie is about treasure hunt. A journalist along with a money minded person, the antagonist, set out on a journey.

Cast
 Srinagar Kitty
 Shruti Hariharan
 Karan Rao
 Abbas
 Girish Karnad
 Chikkanna
 Sadhu Kokila
 Madhuurima
Vaijanath Biradar 
Chikkanna 
Sihi Kahi Chandru 
Neenasam Ashwath 
Doddanna 
B. Jayamma 
Michael Madhu 
Om Prakash Rao 
Kaddipudi Chandru 
Avinash 
K. S. Ravindranath 
Sathish Kumar 
Jeeva 
H. G. Dattatreya
Sharath Lohitashwa
Mukhyamantri Chandru

Production

Soundtrack

Reception 
A critic from Bangalore Mirror wrote that "Savaari 2 tries to pay homage to Savaari, the 2009 film, and in the bargain warps whatever originality it had managed to come up with".

References

External links 

Savaari 2 on Filmbeat

2014 films
Indian romantic drama films
Indian sequel films
2014 romantic drama films
Indian drama road movies
2010s drama road movies
2010s Kannada-language films
Films directed by Jacob Verghese